This is a list of films produced in mainland China ordered by year of release in the 1990s. For an alphabetical listing of Chinese films see :Category:Chinese films

1990
 List of Chinese films of 1990

1991
 List of Chinese films of 1991

1992
 List of Chinese films of 1992

1993
 List of Chinese films of 1993

1994
 List of Chinese films of 1994

1995
 List of Chinese films of 1995

1996
 List of Chinese films of 1996

1997
 List of Chinese films of 1997

1998
 List of Chinese films of 1998

1999
 List of Chinese films of 1999

See also
 
Cinema of China
Best 100 Chinese Motion Pictures as chosen by the 24th Hong Kong Film Awards

External links
IMDb list of Chinese films

Films
Chinese

zh:中国大陆电影